Cumberland North Riding, an electoral district of the Legislative Assembly in the Australian state of New South Wales was created in 1856 and abolished in 1859.


Election results

1858 by-election

1858

1857 by-election

October 1856 by-election

June 1856 by-election

1856

References

New South Wales state electoral results by district